Sir Robert Uniacke-Penrose-Fitzgerald, 1st Baronet of Lisquinlan and Corkbeg (10 July 1839 – 10 July 1919), was a British Conservative politician.

Early life
Fitzgerald was the son of Robert Uniacke Penrose (1800 – 11 June 1857) of Corkbeg House, County Cork. He was educated at Westminster School and Trinity Hall, Cambridge. His sister was the writer Geraldine Penrose Fitzgerald. He rowed at Cambridge and won the University Pairs with J. P. Ingham in 1860. He rowed in the Cambridge boat in the Boat Race in 1861 and 1862 when Oxford won in both years. After university he travelled in India and Tibet from 1863 to 1867.

Political career
Fitzgerald was elected to the House of Commons for Cambridge in the 1885 general election, a seat he held until the 1906 election. In 1896 he adopted the name Uniacke-Penrose-Fitzgerald and was created a baronet, of Lisquinlan in the Parish of Ightermurrough and of Corkbeg Island in the Parish of Corkbeg both in the County of Cork. He was also President of the Council of the Yacht Racing Association.

Personal life
Fitzgerald married Jane Emily Codrington, daughter of General Sir William Codrington, in 1867. They had no children. 

Uniacke-Penrose-Fitzgerald died at Westminster in 1919 on his eightieth birthday, when the baronetcy became extinct. Lady Jane Uniacke-Penrose-Fitzgerald died in 1924.

Ancestry

Arms

See also
List of Cambridge University Boat Race crews

References

VANITY FAIR (SPY) CARTOONS – UK and EIRE

External links
 

1839 births
1919 deaths
People educated at Westminster School, London
Alumni of Trinity Hall, Cambridge
Cambridge University Boat Club rowers
British male rowers
Baronets in the Baronetage of the United Kingdom
Conservative Party (UK) MPs for English constituencies
UK MPs 1895–1900
UK MPs 1900–1906
People from County Cork